Waipapa Point Lighthouse is a lighthouse located at Waipapa Point, Southland, New Zealand. It was first lit on 1 January 1884.

The lighthouse was built in response to the wreck of the passenger steamer Tararua on reefs off Waipapa Point on 29 April 1881, with the loss of 131 lives. With its sibling, the retired Kaipara North Head Lighthouse, this was one of the last two wooden lighthouses built in New Zealand.

The lighthouse was automated and keepers withdrawn in 1975. It has been solar powered since 1988. A new LED beacon was installed externally on the balcony of the lighthouse in December 2008.  Restoration work conducted in 2008 ensured it was weatherproof and secure from vandalism.

See also 

 List of lighthouses in New Zealand

References 
 Waipapa Point Lighthouse, Maritime New Zealand. Retrieved 20 November 2018.

External links 

 
 Lighthouses of New Zealand, Maritime New Zealand

Lighthouses completed in 1883
Lighthouses in New Zealand
The Catlins
Foveaux Strait
1880s architecture in New Zealand
Transport buildings and structures in Southland, New Zealand
Southland District